Year 1442 (MCDXLII) was a common year starting on Monday (link will display the full calendar) of the Julian calendar.

Events 
 January–December 
 March 18–25 – Battle of Hermannstadt: John Hunyadi defeats an army of the Ottoman Empire (80,000 strong), led by Mesid Bey of Vidin, near Sibiu in Transylvania.
 June 2 – Alfonso of Aragon proclaims himself King of Naples.
 September – John Hunyadi defeats another army of the Ottoman Empire (70,000 strong), led by Hadım Şehabeddin, Beylerbey (or governor) of Rumelia, near the Ialomița River. Following this, he places Basarab II as ruler of Wallachia.

 Date unknown 
 The community of Rauma, Finland is granted its town rights.
 The municipality of Juva, Finland is founded.
 The national law of Kristofers landslag is introduced in Sweden. 
 After being imprisoned (before September) by the Sultan, Vlad II Dracul is temporarily replaced, as ruler of Wallachia, by his son Mircea II.
 A fourth tower is added to Liverpool Castle in England.
 Jelena Balšić completes writing the Gorički zbornik manuscripts at her church of St. Mary, on the island of Beška in the Serbian Despotate.
Portuguese sailors first arrive at the Senegal River.

Births 
 April 13 – Henry IV of Neuhaus, High Treasurer of Bohemia (1485–1503), Burgrave of Prague Castle (1503–1507) (d. 1507)
 April 15 – John Paston, English noble (d. 1479)
 April 28 – King Edward IV of England, King of England from 4 March 1461 until 3 October 1470, and again from 11 April 1471 to 3 October 1480 (d. 1483)
 July 3 – Emperor Go-Tsuchimikado of Japan (d. 1500)
 July 15 – Boček IV of Poděbrady, Bohemian nobleman, eldest son of King George of Podebrady (d. 1496)
 September 8 – John de Vere, 13th Earl of Oxford (d. 1513)
 September 27 – John de la Pole, 2nd Duke of Suffolk (d. 1492)
 date unknown
 Ahmad Zarruq, Moroccan scholar and Sufi sheikh (d. 1493)
 Tamás Bakócz, Hungarian archbishop (d. 1521)
 Vannozza dei Cattanei, mistress of Pope Alexander VI

Deaths 
 August 29 – John VI, Duke of Brittany (b. 1389)
 September 25 – Robert de Morley, 6th Baron Morley, Lord of Morley Saint Botolph (b. 1418)
 October 18 – Infante João of Portugal (b. 1400)
 November 14 – Yolande of Aragon, politically active French noblewoman (b. 1384)
 December 18 – Pierre Cauchon, French Catholic bishop (b. 1371)
 December 19 – Elizabeth of Luxembourg (b. 1409)
 date unknown 
 Al-Maqrizi, Egyptian Arab historian
 Ahmed Shah, Sultan of Gujarat
 Nguyễn Trãi, Vietnamese Confucian scholar.

References